Graham Gooch World Class Cricket is a cricket video game developed and published by Audiogenic in 1993. It is endorsed by former England cricketer Graham Gooch and is available for the Amiga and PC computer systems.

Gameplay
The player can play either test matches or One Day Internationals. There are three types of bowling fast, spin and swing. The fielding can either be set manually or automatically. There are three difficulty settings to play at, Amateur, Professional and World Class. The game has pseudo-3D graphics with details such as the shadows of players moving as the sun moves. All test sides (in 1993) are included including a World XI team to play as. Batting averages and other statistics are included.

Versions and updates
Graham Gooch World Class Cricket has many different versions available.
Allan Border cricket: The Australian release of the game.
Battle for the Ashes: A cut down version made specifically for the 1993 Ashes Test series.
Jonty Rhodes II - World Class Cricket: The South African release of the game.
Brian Lara Cricket: An edition that was initially only available from the Game chain of stores in the UK.
Shane Warne '97: An updated version with substantially the same gameplay.

There were also two updates for the game.
Graham Gooch's Second Innings: This update disk required the original game to work, it contained all the updated statistics from 1994. The expansion also added the ability to play "classic" matches such as the 1990 test where Graham Gooch scored his highest score, 333. The ability to play as an English county team is added.
Graham Gooch World Class Cricket - Test Match Special Edition: This version of the game combines the original game with the 2nd Innings update.

Ports 
An Atari Jaguar conversion of the original version was in development by Williams Brothers Developments and planned to be published by Telegames and was showcased at SCES '94 in a non-playable state, with plans to be released around the first quarter of 1995 and later scheduled for a Q2 1995 release but this port was never released due to Atari Corporation exiting from the home video game console market.

Legacy
After Graham Gooch's World Class Cricket, Audiogenic developed Brian Lara Cricket for the Sega Mega Drive which was licensed to Codemasters. In 1996 Codemasters took over the Audiogenic development team and then went on to release a series of cricket games under the Brian Lara and Shane Warne brands. Brian Lara Cricket is a rebranded version of Graham Gooch World Class Cricket.

See also
Graham Gooch
Audiogenic
Brian Lara Cricket (series)

References

External links 
 Graham Gooch World Class Cricket at GameFAQs
 Graham Gooch World Class Cricket at Giant Bomb
 Graham Gooch World Class Cricket at MobyGames

1993 video games
Amiga games
Atari ST games
Cancelled Atari Jaguar games
Commodore 64 games
Cricket video games
Cultural depictions of British men
Cultural depictions of sportspeople
DOS games
Multiplayer and single-player video games
Video games based on real people
Video games developed in the United Kingdom
Video games scored by David Whittaker